Surajpura may refer to:

 Surajpura, Bhopal, a village in Madhya Pradesh, India
 Surajpura, Rohtas, a village in Bihar, India